Tarasyevo is a rural locality (a village) in Kisnemskoye Rural Settlement, Vashkinsky District, Vologda Oblast, Russia. The population was 42 as of 2002. There are 5 streets.

Geography 
Tarasyevo is located 25 km northwest of Lipin Bor (the district's administrative centre) by road. Sidorovo is the nearest rural locality.

References 

Rural localities in Vashkinsky District